Paola Andrea Onzaga Franco (Cali, Valle del Cauca, born April 18, 1982) is a Colombian lawyer who works in women's empowerment, mainly in the scopes of political decision-making and representation.

Education 
Onzaga obtained her law degree from Universidad de San Buenaventura, in Cali, Colombia, and then specialized in Administrative Law at Universidad Santiago de Cali. After that, she moved to Spain, where she got a Master's Degree in Citizenship, Human Rights, Politics and Ethics, from Universidad de Barcelona.

Career 
After ending her studies in Spain, Onzaga returned to Colombia and has worked as a teacher in Pontificia Universidad Javeriana Cali since 2014.

At the same time, she focused on analyzing the conditions of around two hundred women in Latin America and began her work as facilitator at the political incidence schools for women in Santiago de Cali's town hall. Paola Onzaga was the political-social empowerment coordinator of the Gender Equity Suboffice, where she led the election and conformation of the Municipality Women's Table, in which some women who were former members of the guerrilla combatant forces participated.

Currently, she works with the Successful Women Latam Foundation, in which she organizes talks and events about female empowerment.

Distinctions 
Onzaga has received distinctions related to her work in women's empowerment:

 , given by the president of the senate of Puerto Rico: Thomas Rivera Schatz, 2019.
 , given by Puerto Rican senator Evelyn Vázquez Nieves, 2019.

References 

Colombian women lawyers
21st-century Colombian lawyers
1982 births
Living people